Puyan is a metro station on Line 4 of the Hangzhou Metro in China. It is located in the Binjiang District of Hangzhou and it is the southern terminus of Line 4.

References

Railway stations in Zhejiang
Railway stations in China opened in 2018
Hangzhou Metro stations